Nico Smit is a Namibian politician who has served in the National Assembly since Namibia's independence in 1990. He represents the Popular Democratic Movement.

Political career
Smit began his politics career in the 1980s in the fight against apartheid for the Independence of Namibia. Since his election to the Namibian parliament, he has served in various parliamentary committees including the Foreign Affairs Committee and the Economics and Public Administration Committee.

References

Popular Democratic Movement politicians
Politicians from Windhoek
Year of birth missing (living people)
Living people
White Namibian people
Members of the National Assembly (Namibia)